Island Medics is a fly-on-the-wall documentary programme based around the day-to-day running of the NHS services in Shetland, Scotland and aired on BBC One. The majority of the filming shows the treatment of patients admitted to the Gilbert Bain Hospital in Lerwick, but it also features other aspects of the medical profession and emergency services that take place in other locations in Shetland, as well as other aspects of island life.

The programme has subsequently been used as a promotional platform by Promote Shetland to encourage those in the medical profession to consider moving to and working in Shetland.

References

Sources

External links
 Production website

Mass media in Shetland
2017 British television series debuts